William Holbrook Beard (April 13, 1824February 20, 1900) was an  American artistic painter who is known best for his satirical paintings of beasts performing human-like activities.

Life

Beard was born in Painesville, Ohio. He studied abroad, is associated with the Düsseldorf school of painting, and during 1861 relocated to New York City, where, in 1862, he became a member of the National Academy of Design. Beard initiated his own artist's studio on Tenth Street in New York City in a building known as the Studio Building.

Beard was a prolific artist. His humorous treatment of bears, cats, dogs, horses and monkeys, generally with some human occupation and expression, usually satirical, gave him a great vogue at one time, and his pictures were much reproduced.

His brother, James Henry Beard (1814–1893), was also a painter.

William is buried in Green-Wood Cemetery in Brooklyn, New York.

Article features 
In 1999, William Beard was featured in an article in the American Art Journal written by Sarah Burns. He is mentioned among other political satirists of the mid to late 19th century.

Selected works

Lo, The Poor Indian (1876) - oil painting, Utah Museum of Fine Arts.

References

External links

 Burial search at Green-Wood Cemetery
 
 Artwork by William Holbrook Beard
The American Art Journal by Sarah Burns

19th-century American painters
American male painters
Animal artists
People from Painesville, Ohio
1824 births
1900 deaths
Artists from Ohio
Burials at Green-Wood Cemetery
Düsseldorf school of painting
19th-century American male artists